Akdeğirmen Dam is a dam in Afyonkarahisar Province, Turkey, built between 1998 and 2003.

See also
List of dams and reservoirs in Turkey

External links
DSI

Dams in Afyonkarahisar Province
Dams completed in 2003